The Coast Open, or Abierto del Litoral, is a golf tournament played in Argentina. Founded in 1932 as the Torneo de Profesionales (Professional Tournament), a name only used for the first two editions, it has always been played at the Rosario Golf Club in Rosario, Santa Fe.

The tournament has been a fixture on the PGA Tour Latinoamérica Developmental Series. It was previously an annual stop on the higher level Tour de las Américas from 2000 until 2010 having been an event on that tours predecessor, the South American Tour, between 1993 and 1999. It was also included on the European Challenge Tour schedule in 2007 (2008 season), being one of five tournaments held in Latin America, and four in Argentina, that season.

Fidel de Luca has the most victories, with eight. In 1932, 1952 and 1983 the championship ended in a tie, with no playoff being held to determine an outright winner.

Winners

Source:

Notes

References

External links
Tour de las Americas - official site
TPG Tour - official site
Rosario Golf Club - official site

Golf tournaments in Argentina
Tour de las Américas events
Recurring sporting events established in 1932